Pathy Alondo Malumandsoko (born 11 May 2000) is a French professional footballer who plays as a centre-back for Ukrainian Premier League club Metalist Kharkiv.

Career
In 2017, he played for SM Caen II, moving to the senior team in 2020. The following year, he moved to Apollon Pontus. In March 2023 he signed for Metalist Kharkiv in the Ukrainian Premier League.

References

External links
 

2000 births
Living people
Sportspeople from Fontainebleau
French footballers
Association football defenders
Stade Malherbe Caen players
Apollon Pontou FC players
FC Metalist Kharkiv players
Championnat National 3 players
Championnat National 2 players
Ligue 2 players
Super League Greece 2 players
Ukrainian Premier League players
French expatriate footballers
Expatriate footballers in Greece
French expatriate sportspeople in Greece
Expatriate footballers in Ukraine
French expatriate sportspeople in Ukraine
Footballers from Seine-et-Marne